The Mudar was a principal grouping of the northern Arab tribes.

History
The Mudar and Rabi'a are recorded in central Arabia in the Arabic histories of the pre-Islamic period; the kings of the Kindah bore the title of "king of the Ma'ad (or Mudar) and Rabi'a", and they played a role in the conflicts with the Yemeni (southern Arab) tribes. It is unclear, however, in how far these tribes really emerged in the manner described, or are later, artificial designations that emerged through inter-tribal rivalries and conflicts. Even the conflict between the Yemeni and northern tribes is considered by some modern scholars to be a later invention, reflecting the tribal rivalries of the Umayyad period rather than the realities of pre-Islamic Arabia. According to the Arabic sources, a large number of Mudar (identified by some modern scholars with the Μαυζανῖται, Mauzanitae, of the Byzantine sources) also migrated to Upper Mesopotamia, where they gave their name to the district of Diyar Mudar. After the collapse of the Kindah kingdom, the Mudar of central Arabia came under the control of the Lakhmid kings of al-Hira during the reign of al-Mundhir III.

The Mudar dominated Mecca after driving out the Jurhum, and held some of the religious offices connected with the Ka'aba sanctuary. Unlike the Rabi'a, who converted to Christianity in large numbers, the Mudar remained attached to the traditional polytheistic religion. The idol of al-Uzza at Nakhla, "revered by all the Mudar" according to al-Tabari, was destroyed by Khalid ibn al-Walid in 630. Although the Muzayna boasted of having accepted Muhammad and Islam already in AH 5 (626/7 CE), it was not until the "Year of the Deputations" in 631 that the other Mudar tribes began converting to Islam.

Traditional ancestor

According to the Arab genealogists, Mudar was the son of Nizar ibn Ma'ad ibn Adnan by Sawda bint Akk ibn Adnan.

References

Sources

See also 
 Arab tribes
 Qays

 
Tribes of Arabia